|}

The Grabel Mares Hurdle is a Listed National Hunt hurdle race in Ireland which is open to mares aged four years or older. It is run at Punchestown over a distance of about 2 miles and 2 furlongs (2 miles 2 furlongs and  25 yards, or 3,644 metres), and it is scheduled to take place each year in November.

The race was first run in 2005 and was awarded Grade 3 status in 2012.  It was downgraded to Listed for the 2014 season. Prior to 2015 it was run in October.

Records
Most successful horse (2 wins):
 Blazing Sky – 2006,2007
 Voler La Vedette - 2009,2010
 Stormy Ireland - 2018,2019)

Leading jockey (4 wins):
 Barry Geraghty – 	Queen Astrid (2005), Voler La Vedette (2010), Jacksonslady (2011), Cailin Annamh (2013)Leading trainer  (7 wins):
 Willie Mullins -  Tarla (2012), Whiteout (2015), Let's Dance (2016), Stormy Ireland (2018,2019), Buildmeupbuttercup (2020), Dysart Diamond (2021) ''

Winners

See also 
 Horse racing in Ireland
 List of Irish National Hunt races

References
Racing Post:

National Hunt hurdle races
National Hunt races in Ireland
Punchestown Racecourse
Recurring sporting events established in 2005
2005 establishments in Ireland